Urban public parks and gardens in Hong Kong include:

Note: Most public parks and gardens in Hong Kong are managed by the Leisure and Cultural Services Department (LCSD).

Hong Kong Island
 Aberdeen Promenade (Aberdeen)
 Aldrich Bay Park (Aldrich Bay, Sai Wan Ho)
 Blake Garden (Sheung Wan)
 Chai Wan Park (Chai Wan)
 Chater Garden (Central)
 Cheung Kong Park (Central) (managed by Cheung Kong, open to public)
 Choi Sai Woo Park (Braemar Hill, North Point)
 Connaught Place (Central)
 Harcourt Garden (Admiralty)
 Hollywood Road Park (Sheung Wan)
 Hong Kong Park (Admiralty)
 Hong Kong Zoological and Botanical Gardens (Mid-Levels)
 King George V Memorial Park, Hong Kong (Sai Ying Pun)
 Pak Tsz Lane Park (Central)
 Quarry Bay Park (Quarry Bay)
 Southorn Playground (Wan Chai)
 Statue Square (Central)
 Sun Yat Sen Memorial Park (Sheung Wan)
 Tamar Park (Tamar)
 Wong Nai Chung Reservoir Park (Mid-levels)
 Victoria Park (Causeway Bay)
 Victoria Peak Garden (Victoria Peak)

Kowloon and New Kowloon

 Choi Hung Road Playground
 Fa Hui Park
 Hoi Bun Road Park (Kwun Tong)
 Hoi Sham Park (To Kwa Wan)
 Hong Ning Road Park (Kwun Tong)
 Hutchison Park (Hung Hom)
 Jordan Valley Park
 King George V Memorial Park, Kowloon
 King's Park
 Ko Shan Road Park, To Kwa Wan
 Kowloon Bay Park
 Kowloon Park (Tsim Sha Tsui)
 Kowloon Tsai Park
 Kowloon Walled City Park (Kowloon City)
 Kwun Tong Promenade
 Lai Chi Kok Park (Mei Foo)
 Nan Lian Garden (Diamond Hill)
 Morse Park
 Nam Cheong Park
 Ngau Chi Wan Park
 Po Kong Village Road Park
 Sau Mau Ping Memorial Park
 Sham Shui Po Park (Sham Shui Po)
 Shek Kip Mei Park (Sham Shui Po)
 Sung Wong Toi Park (Kowloon City)
 Tung Chau Street Park (Sham Shui Po)
 Urban Council Centenary Garden (Tsim Sha Tsui East)
 Yuen Po Street Bird Garden
 West Kowloon Waterfront Promenade

New Territories (excluding New Kowloon)

 Central Kwai Chung Park
 Hong Kong Velodrome Park (Tseung Kwan O)
 Ma On Shan Park
 Ma On Shan Promenade
 North District Park
 Penfold Park (in the middle of Sha Tin Racecourse)
 Po Hong Park
 Po Tsui Park
 Sha Tin Park (in Sha Tin New Town)
 Shing Mun Valley Park
 Tai Po Waterfront Park
 Tin Shui Wai Park
 Tsing Yi Northeast Park
 Tsing Yi Park
 Tsing Yi Promenade
 Tsuen Wan Park
 Tsuen Wan Riviera Park
 Tuen Mun Park
 Tung Chung North Park
 Yuen Chau Kok Park
 Yuen Long Park

See also

 List of buildings and structures in Hong Kong
 Country parks and conservation in Hong Kong

External links
Leisure and Cultural Services Department - Parks, Zoos and Gardens in Hong Kong
 Full list (look under "Public pleasure grounds (other than bathing beaches)")
Large parks in Hong Kong, from HK-place.com
Unique parks in Hong Kong, from HK-place.com
Film Service Office: List of Parks

Parks
 Lists
Hong Kong
Hong Kong
Urban public parks and gardens in Hong Kong